Something Special may refer to:

 "Something Special" (short story), a 1957 short story by Iris Murdoch
 Something Special (TV series), a BBC children's television series
 Something Special (The Kingston Trio album), 1962
 Something Special (Kool & the Gang album), 1981
 Something Special (Dolly Parton album), 1995
 Something Special (Jim Reeves album), 1971
 Something Special (George Strait album), 1985
 Something Special (Hampton Hawes album), recorded in 1976 and released in 1994
 Something Special (Sabrina album), 1988
 Something Special (The Sylvers album), 1976
 Something Special – The Best of Bigbang, a compilation album
 Something Special, an album by Burl Ives
 "Something Special" (song), a 2020 song by Pop Smoke
 "Something Special", a song by Alex Lloyd from Black the Sun
 "Something Special", a song by Eric Clapton from Another Ticket
 "Something Special (Is Gonna Happen Tonight)", a song by Patti LaBelle from Winner in You.
 Something Special, a blended Scotch whisky manufactured by Pernod Ricard
Something Special, a later title for the 1986 film Willy/Milly

See also
 Someone Special (disambiguation)
 Somethin' Special (disambiguation)